Route 110 is  long highway in New Brunswick, Canada; running from the Canada–US border crossing at Bridgewater, Maine as a continuation of Boundary Line Road, a connector to U.S. Route 1 (US 1). The route crosses through Carleton County, crossing Route 2 (Trans-Canada Highway) in Centreville. The route runs along the Saint John River before reaching Florenceville-Bristol, where it terminates at an intersection with Route 130 on the riverbank.

Historically, Route 110 was known as Route 6 until 1965, and Route 555 between 1965 and 1970.

Route description 
Route 110 beings at the Bridgewater - Centreville Border Crossing in Centerville as a continuation of Boundary Line Road, a local road to downtown Bridgewater, Maine. The route runs along the bank of the Big Presque Isle Stream, passing a junction with Royalton Road, which connects to the community of Lower Royalton. After turning away from the steam, Route 110 runs southeast into a junction with Route 550 as it enters the small residential community of Tracey Mills, marking the terminus of Route 550.

Route 110 continues east through Tracey Mills, continuing along the Big Presque Isle Stream into the village of Centreville. Running as a two-lane road through Centreville, the route bends northeast, passing the Centreville Community School and gaining the name Centre Street at the intersection with Route 560 in the center of the village. Route 110 leaves Centreville and enters rural Carleton County. The route then enters a valley, where it reaches a diamond interchange with Route 2 (Highway of Heroes) and the Trans-Canada Highway.

Now known as Centreville Road, Route 110 runs northeast away from Route 2 and enters Florenceville-Bristol, where it intersects with the northern end of Route 103 (Centreville Road). Route 110 continues into Florenceville-Bristol, making a 90-degree turn towards the Saint John River, reaching an intersection with Route 130. This junction marks the eastern terminus of Route 110.

Junction list

See also
List of New Brunswick provincial highways

References

New Brunswick provincial highways
Roads in Carleton County, New Brunswick